Error analysis can refer to one of the following:

Error analysis (mathematics) is concerned with the changes in the output of the model as the parameters to the model vary about a mean.
Error analysis (linguistics) studies the types and causes of language errors.
Error analysis for the Global Positioning System
"Error analysis" is sometimes used for engineering practices such as described under Fault tree analysis.